Perković may refer to:

 Perković, Croatia, a village near Šibenik, Dalmatia
 Perković (surname), a Croatian surname